Ushna Shah is a Pakistani actress who works in Urdu television. She made her acting debut in 2013 with Mere Khwabon Ka Diya. Shah gained her first recognition with the 2014 thriller romance Bashar Momin portrayed Rudaba. She rose to prominence as main protagonist in several critically acclaimed serials, including Thoda Sa Aasman (2016), Neelam Kinaray (2016) and Ru Baru Ishq Tha (2018). 

She is also known for playing against type in the 2017 spiritual Alif Allah Aur Insaan that earned her a Hum Award for Best Negative Actress and the 2018 psychological thriller Balaa for which she received nomination for Best Actress at Lux Style Awards. Among her awards is the Best Emerging Talent Female at the 4th Pakistan Media Awards for Mere Khwabon Ka Diya.

Personal life 
Shah was born in Lahore and raised in Canada. She is the daughter of TV and radio artist Ismat Tahira, the sister of Shah Sharabeel, theatre director, and the half-sister of Irsa Ghazal, also an actress. She married professional golfer Hamza Amin on 26 February 2023, two months after announcing her engagement.

Career 
She began her career with character roles, including the serial Bashar Momin in 2014, the drama serial Duaa (2015) in which she played the title character, and Alif Allah Aur Insaan (2017) in the role of a beggar turned courtesan. She was cast in Jawad Bashir's Teri Meri Love Story in which she played the leading character Eesha, but the film was halted post production and the official release never happened. She also starred in the first online Pakistani comedy film Oye Kuch Kar Guzar by D-juice Pakistan. She also appeared as a guest in the film Punjab Nahi Jaungi.

She has been the brand ambassador for the fashion label Nickie Nina, and has done campaigns for various lawn brands such as Jahanara.

In June 2017 she wrote on Facebook criticising what she said was the trend of various talk shows using Ramadan to cash in on television rating points.

Filmography

Television

Telefilm 
 2013: Anokhay Raqeeb
 2013:Dil Kaleji Hogaya
 2014:Mujhse Shaadi Karogi
 2014: Rab Ne Bna Di Jodi
 2014: Zindagi Ab Bhi Muskurati Hai
 2014: Kuch Iss Tarha
 2015: Pyari Bhangan 
 2015: Jhoot Wala Love 
 2015: Rahay Salamat Jodi
 2016: Sab Say Mushkil Shaadi
 2016: Sanaullah Ki Dusri Shaadi
 2016: Socha Na Tha Pyaar Karenge
 2016: Aitebaar
 2017: Rishta Baraye Farokht
 2017: Meray Sanwariya Ka Naam
 2017: Aisay Na Tu Jaa
2021: Hum Tum
2022: Mast Mohabbat

Awards and nominations 
 Best Emerging Talent Female at 4th Pakistan Media Awards for Mere Khwabon Ka Diya
 Hum Awards for Best Soap Actress at 3rd Hum Awards for Hum Tehray Gunahgar'''
 Hum Award for Best Negative Character at 6th Hum Awards for Alif Allah Aur Insaan''
Nominated-Lux Style Awards for Best Television Actress for Balaa

References

External links 
 
 

Living people
Actresses from Karachi
Pakistani television actresses
21st-century Pakistani actresses
Pakistani emigrants to Canada
Actresses from Toronto
Naturalized citizens of Canada
1984 births